Mitchell v. United States may refer to
 Mitchell v. United States (1863), 96 U.S. 162
 Mitchell v. United States (1874), 88 U.S. 350
 Mitchell v. United States (1925), 267 U.S. 341
 Mitchell v. United States (1941), 313 U.S. 80, concerning the racial integration of transport
 Mitchell v. United States (1962), 368 U.S. 439
 Mitchell v. United States (1999), 526 U.S. 314 concerning two Fifth Amendment privileges related to a criminal defendant's rights against self-incrimination

See also
Several cases brought by Colin Mitchel concerning aboriginal title to lands in Florida transferred under Spanish rule may be referred to as Mitchel v. United States:
Colin Mitchell v. The United States, 33 U.S. 307, 1834
Colin Mitchel Robert v. The United States, 34 U.S. 711, 1835
Colin Mitchel v. United States, 40 U.S. 52. 1841 (see Aboriginal title in the Taney Court#Spanish Florida and Louisiana)